St Ignatius of Loyola Catholic College will be a Catholic co-educational secondary school in the Jesuit tradition located in Burtt's Rd, Drury, Auckland, New Zealand. The school's's proprietor is the Catholic Bishop of Auckland and it be will be a State-integrated school. It is anticipated that this new college will open in 2024 with 340 students, growing progressively to 900 by 2028. The establishment of the school is the fruition of the long held dreams of building a school in the Jesuit tradition in service of the South Auckland community.

Part of the funding for the establishment of the school came from the Harold Plumley Endowment.

The  first principal of the college, Mr Dean Wearmouth, was appointed in 2022. The planting of the campus commenced.

References 

Catholic secondary schools in Auckland
Christianity in Auckland
History of Auckland
Jesuit secondary schools in New Zealand